Husainyyat is a village in the northern portion of Jordan, lying between Ajlun and Jerash. 

Villages in Jordan